Motor disorders are disorders of the nervous system that cause abnormal and involuntary movements. They can result from damage to the motor system.

Motor disorders are defined in the fifth edition of the Diagnostic and Statistical Manual of Mental Disorders (DSM-5) – published in 2013 to replace the fourth text revision (DSM-IV-TR) – as a new sub-category of neurodevelopmental disorders.  The DSM-5 motor disorders include developmental coordination disorder, stereotypic movement disorder, and the tic disorders including Tourette syndrome.

Signs and symptoms 

Motor disorders are malfunctions of the nervous system that cause involuntary or uncontrollable movements or actions of the body. These disorders can cause lack of intended movement or an excess of involuntary movement. Symptoms of motor disorders include tremors, jerks, twitches, spasms, contractions, or gait problems.

Tremor is the uncontrollable shaking of an arm or a leg. Twitches or jerks of body parts may occur due to a startling sound or unexpected, sudden pain. Spasms and contractions are temporary abnormal resting positions of hands or feet. Spasms are temporary while contractions could be permanent. Gait problems are problems with the way one walks or runs. This can mean an unsteady pace or dragging of the feet along with other possible irregularities.

Causes 

Pathological changes of certain areas of the brain are the main causes of most motor disorders. Causes of motor disorders by genetic mutation usually affect the cerebrum. The way humans move requires many parts of the brain to work together to perform a complex process. The brain must send signals to the muscles instructing them to perform a certain action. There are constant signals being sent to and from the brain and the muscles that regulate the details of the movement such as speed and direction, so when a certain part of the brain malfunctions, the signals can be incorrect or uncontrollable causing involuntary or uncontrollable actions or movements.

Diagnosis

References 

Developmental neuroscience
Extrapyramidal and movement disorders
Neurological disorders
Symptoms and signs: Nervous and musculoskeletal systems
Neurodevelopmental disorders